Guerrero is one of the 38 municipalities of Coahuila, in north-eastern Mexico. The municipal seat lies at Guerrero. The municipality covers an area of 3,219.7 km² and is located on the international border between Mexico and the USA, here formed by the Río Bravo del Norte (Rio Grande), adjacent to the U.S. state of Texas.

As of 2010, the municipality had a total population of 2,091.

Towns and villages

The largest localities (cities, towns, and villages) are:

Adjacent municipalities and counties

 Hidalgo Municipality - southeast
 Villa Unión Municipality - southwest and west
 Nava Municipality - northwest
 Piedras Negras Municipality - northwest
 Maverick County, Texas - north and northeast
 Webb County, Texas - east

See also
Mission San Francisco Solano

References

Municipalities of Coahuila